December 26 - Eastern Orthodox liturgical calendar - December 28

All fixed commemorations below are observed on January 9 by Eastern Orthodox Churches on the Old Calendar.

For December 27th, Orthodox Churches on the Old Calendar commemorate the Saints listed on December 14.

Feasts
 Third Day of the Feast of the Nativity.

Saints
 Archdeacon Stephen the Protomartyr (34)
 Saint Maximus, Pope of Alexandria (282)
 Martyrs Maurice, with his son Photinus, and 70 soldiers, at Apamea (286-305)  (see also: February 22)
 Saint Theodore, Patriarch of Constantinople (686)
 Venerable Theodore the Branded (Theodore Graptus), of Palestine and Bithynia, Confessor (840)
 Venerable Luke, Abbot of the Monastery of the Deep Stream in Triglia, in Bithynia.

Pre-Schism Western saints
 Saint Fabiola, a patrician in Rome who gave up all earthly pleasures and devoted herself to the practice of Christian asceticism and charitable work (399)

Post-Schism Orthodox saints
 Venerable Abbot Boniface (Vinogradsky), founder of St. Panteleimon Monastery, Kiev (1871)

New martyrs and confessors
 New Hieromartyrs Tikhon (Nikanorov), Archbishop of Voronezh, and with him 160 martyred priests (1919)
 Virgin-Martyr Antonina (1937)

Other commemorations
 Uncovering of Relics (1514) of Venerable Pherapont (Therapont) of Mozhaisk, Luzhetsk. (see also: May 27 - feast day.)
 Repose of Nicholas Ilminsky, Missionary to the Tatars (1891)
 Repose of Archimandrite Agathangelus of Svir and Valaam (1909)
 Repose of Helen Ivanovna Motovilova (1910)
 Repose of Abbot Athanasius of Grigoriou Monastery, Mt. Athos (1953)
 Repose of Archimandrite Seraphim (Rozenberg) of the Pskov-Caves Monastery (1993)

Icons
 Icon of the Mother of God "the Merciful".

Icon gallery

Notes

References

Sources
 December 27/January 9. Orthodox Calendar (PRAVOSLAVIE.RU).
 January 9 / December 27. HOLY TRINITY RUSSIAN ORTHODOX CHURCH (A parish of the Patriarchate of Moscow).
 December 27. OCA - The Lives of the Saints.
 The Autonomous Orthodox Metropolia of Western Europe and the Americas (ROCOR). St. Hilarion Calendar of Saints for the year of our Lord 2004. St. Hilarion Press (Austin, TX). p. 3.
 December 27. Latin Saints of the Orthodox Patriarchate of Rome.
 The Roman Martyrology. Transl. by the Archbishop of Baltimore. Last Edition, According to the Copy Printed at Rome in 1914. Revised Edition, with the Imprimatur of His Eminence Cardinal Gibbons. Baltimore: John Murphy Company, 1916. pp. 398–399.
Greek Sources
 Great Synaxaristes:  27 ΔΕΚΕΜΒΡΙΟΥ. ΜΕΓΑΣ ΣΥΝΑΞΑΡΙΣΤΗΣ.
  Συναξαριστής. 27 Δεκεμβρίου. ECCLESIA.GR. (H ΕΚΚΛΗΣΙΑ ΤΗΣ ΕΛΛΑΔΟΣ). 
Russian Sources
  9 января (27 декабря). Православная Энциклопедия под редакцией Патриарха Московского и всея Руси Кирилла (электронная версия). (Orthodox Encyclopedia - Pravenc.ru).
  27 декабря (ст.ст.) 9 января 2013 (нов. ст.). Русская Православная Церковь Отдел внешних церковных связей. (DECR).

December in the Eastern Orthodox calendar